is a Dance Dance Revolution game for the Sony PlayStation console. The game features songs from the Japanese children's TV show Oha Star. There is no arcade counterpart.

Gameplay

Music
Oha Suta Dance Dance Revolution, primarily consists of songs from Oha Suta, but the game also includes a number of Konami Originals, such as "Cutie Chaser (Morning Mix)", "Brilliant 2U", "Keep On Movin'" and "Make a Jam!".

References

External links
Full songlist on DDRFreak

2000 video games
Video games based on television series
PlayStation (console)-only games
Dance Dance Revolution games
Video games developed in Japan
Japan-exclusive video games
PlayStation (console) games